Oleh Kramarenko (born 27 August 1994) is a professional Ukrainian football striker who played for the Ukrainian Premier League club SC Tavriya Simferopol.

Kramarenko is the product of Mykolaiv youth sportive school and FC Torpedo Mykolaiv. He made his debut for SC Tavriya Simferopol as start-game player in the game against FC Illichivets Mariupol on 16 May 2014 in Ukrainian Premier League.

References

External links

1994 births
Living people
Sportspeople from Mykolaiv
Ukrainian footballers
Ukrainian Premier League players
SC Tavriya Simferopol players
FC Torpedo Mykolaiv players
FC Myr Hornostayivka players
FC Berkut Armyansk players
FC Vradiyivka players
FC Vast Mykolaiv players
Crimean Premier League players

Association football forwards